Jadwiga (diminutives: Jadzia , Iga) is a Polish feminine given name. It originated from the old German feminine given name Hedwig (variants of which include Hedwiga), which is compounded from hadu, "battle", and wig, "fight". 

Jadwiga may refer to:

 Jadwiga (wife of Władysław Odonic) (died 1249), Duchess consort of Greater Poland
 Jadwiga of Kalisz (1266–1339), Queen of Poland and mother of Casimir III of Poland
 Jadwiga of Żagań (before 1350–1390), Queen of Poland, wife of Casimir III of Poland (daughter-in-law of previous)
 Jadwiga of Poland (1374–1399), female monarch of Poland, named after Saint Hedwig of Andechs
 Jadwiga Dzido (1918–1985), Polish survivor of Ravensbrück concentration camp
 Jadwiga Jagiellon (disambiguation), several Polish princesses of that name

See also 
 Hedwig (disambiguation)
 Hadewijch
 Edwige

Polish feminine given names